Yusuke Yanagi (Kanji:, Yanagi Yusuke; born 1955) is a Japanese virologist currently at Kyushu University and an Elected Fellow of the American Association for the Advancement of Science.

References

External links
  Japan Science and Technology Agency
 Kyushu University Academic Staff Educational and Research Activities Database

Year of birth missing (living people)
Living people
Fellows of the American Association for the Advancement of Science
Japanese virologists
People from Fukuoka Prefecture